Prof. Dr. Sunaryati Hartono, S.H. (born  Carolina Felicita Gerardine Sunaryati Sastrowardoyo; July 7, 1931) is an Indonesian attorney, lawyer, professor of law and government official. She has been vice chairman of the National Ombudsman Commission of Indonesia since 2000.

Delegate and representative
In 1985, as part of the ASEAN Law Association's Law Professional Exchange Programme, Dr. Hartono visited ASEAN member states to give lectures on the legal system of Indonesia. The two other lecturers were Ricardo Puno, justice minister of the Philippines and Dr. Apirat Petchsiri of Thailand.

Dr. Hartono was Indonesia's delegate to CEDAW in the late 1990s.

On 20 March 2000, President Abdurrahman Wahid issued a presidential decree establishing the National Ombudsman Commission. "The Commission was established to help create and develop a conducive climate for the fight against corruption, collusion and nepotism, along with the protection of the rights of the general public in receiving public services, justice and better welfare. The Commission has the mandate to receive, investigate, and follow through reports from the general public concerning the protection of their rights and
the services provided by the Government." Eight commission members were installed by the president at the Jakarta State Palace, including Antonius Sujata as chairman and Dr. Hartono as vice chairman.

Family
Dr. Hartono is the eldest daughter of Prof. Mr. Soenario, S.H. (1902–1997), Indonesian minister of foreign affairs in the mid-1950s and ambassador to the court of St. James, and Dina Maria Geraldine Maranta (née Pantouw) Soenario (?-1995). A sister, Astrid Susanto, deputy chairwoman of the People's Representative Council's Commission I, died in 2006. One younger sister, Sunardien, is an economist and her youngest sister, Wuryastuti Sunario, is managing director of the Indonesia Tourism Promotion Board. A brother, Irawan Sunario, lives in Jakarta.

Dr. Hartono's husband was the late Dr. Antonius Borromaeus Hartono Sosroseputro.

Bibliography
 In Search of New Legal Principles (1979) ASIN B0006E4JRU
 Apakah Rule of Law Itu? (1982)
 Politik Hukum Menuju Satu Sistem Hukum Nasional (1991) 
 Penelitian Hukum Di Indonesia Pada Akhir Abad Ke-20 (1994) 
 Business and the Legal Profession in an Age of Computerization and Globalization (2000)
 The Indonesian Law on Contracts (2001)
 Political Change and Legal Reform towards Democracy and Supremacy of Law in Indonesia (2002)
 Bhinneka Tunggal Ika: Sebagai Asas Hukum bagi Penbangunan Hukum Nasional. Bandung: Penerbit PT Citra Aditya Bakti, 2006.

As editor
 (with Hendarman Djarab and Lili Irahali) Semangat Kebangsaan Dan Politik Luar Negeri Indonesia : Peringatan 100 Tahun Prof. Mr. Sunario, Mantan Menteri Luar Negeri, Perintis Kemerdekaan, 28 Agustus 1902-28 Agustus 2002. Bandung: Penerbit Angkasa Bandung, 2002.

References

1931 births
Indonesian diplomats
Indonesian non-fiction writers
Indonesian Roman Catholics
Javanese people
Minahasa people
Living people
People from Medan
Sastrowardoyo family
20th-century Indonesian women politicians
20th-century Indonesian politicians
Indonesian women diplomats
Indonesian women writers
21st-century Indonesian women politicians
21st-century Indonesian politicians